1812 earthquake may refer to:

1812 Caracas earthquake (Venezuela)
1811–12 New Madrid earthquakes (Mississippi River, US) (river tsunamis)
1812 San Juan Capistrano earthquake (California, US), also known as the Wrightwood earthquake 
1812 Ventura earthquake (California, US), also known as the Mission San Buenaventura or Santa Barbara earthquake

See also
List of historical earthquakes